Senkō-ji (全興寺) is a Buddhist temple in Hirano-ku, Osaka Prefecture, Japan.

See also 
Thirteen Buddhist Sites of Osaka

External links 
Official website 

Buddhist temples in Osaka
Hirano-ku, Osaka
Kōyasan Shingon temples
Prince Shōtoku